The 2019 Dubai World Cup was a horse race run at Meydan Racecourse in Dubai on 30 March 2019. It was the 24th running of the race. The total prize money for the race was US$12 million, with the winner receiving $7.2 million. This was an increase of $2 million on the previous year, making it the world's richest horse race in 2019.

The race was won for the second year running by Thunder Snow, who became the first horse to win the Dubai World Cup twice.

Entries

A total of 13 horses were entered for the race, including Godolphin's defending champion Thunder Snow, who was bidding to become the first horse to win the race for a second time. Al Maktoum Challenge winners North America (Rounds 1 and 2) and Capezzano (Round 3) headed a strong local challenge from the United Arab Emirates, which also included Axelrod, Gronkowski and New Trails. The United States was also well represented with Pegasus World Cup runner-up Seeking The Soul, Breeders' Cup Classic runner-up Gunnevera, along with Audible, Pavel and Yoshida. The field was completed by Japanese challenger K T Brave and the Korean-trained Dolkong.

Road to Meydan

The contenders' results in key races during the build-up to the Dubai World Cup.

Race card

The draw for the race was made on 27 March.

K T Brave was later withdrawn, reducing the field to 12.

Race

Summary

North America was fastest out of the gates and took an early lead, with defending champion Thunder Snow breaking well from the second widest draw to move in behind the leader, alongside Capezzano, who was pulling hard on the inside. As the horses settled, Gronkowski moved through to challenge North America for the lead, with the leaders closely followed by Thunder Snow, Capezzano and New Trails. The positions at the front of the race remained unchanged until the final bend, where Capezzano and New Trails quickly faded. Into the home straight, North America started to drop back as Thunder Snow challenged Gronkowski for the lead. The two horses, now clear of the rest of the field, battled all the way to the line, with Thunder Snow getting up to win by a nose in a photo finish, becoming the first horse to win two Dubai World Cups. Gunnevera ran on from the back to take third place, with Pavel staying on to finish fourth.

Full result

References

External links
Dubai Racing Club
Emirates Racing Authority

Dubai World Cup
Dubai World Cup
Dubai World Cup
Dubai World Cup